Scheugenpflug AG is one of the leading manufacturers of adhesive bonding, dispensing and potting systems for synthetic resins or thermally conductive pastes. In this special segment only few enterprises of super regional importance are active in the whole world. Target industries include automotive and electronics industry, telecommunications engineering, medical technology and the chemical industry.

Development
Founded in 1990 by Erich Scheugenpflug, who gained first experience in resin casting as employee of Siemens AG in Munich. In the course of the years the enterprise accomplished a leading role in the market for resin dispensing systems by gaining special know-how, demonstrated by numerous patents.

In the course of the years it became obvious, that manufacturing steps before and after the casting had to be integrated into the design of resin casting systems in order to optimize the whole process. This caused the addition of automation to the range of products.

Because the company is active not only in the highly industrialized countries of Europe and in USA, but also in emerging markets like India  or Mexico, it was necessary to adapt the degree of automation of the delivered systems and machines to the level of wages and to the level of skills of the employees. This resulted in the creation of preconfigured modular compounds that can be put together quickly to form individually designed systems.

Now (2017) Scheugenpflug AG operates four subsidiaries in China, USA and Mexico and has sales partners in many parts of the world. The company employs more than 470 people worldwide, of which about 370 work in the German headquarters.

Since 2020, Scheugenpflug belongs to the Atlas Copco enterprise, Sweden. In September 2020, the legal form of the Scheugenpflug AG was changed into a GmbH.

Products

Scheugenpflug AG mainly produces piston dispensing systems. The product portfolio features various dispensers and dispensing cells for both atmospheric dispensing and vacuum potting.

The company also manufactures a variety of material preparation and feeding systems for liquid and pasty materials, even for such containing highly abrasive fillers. These systems are designed for container sizes ranging from standard cartridges to barrels. A patented vacuum follower plate was designed to facilitate the material feed from pails while reducing material waste.

In the area of process automation Scheugenpflug provides all systems along the whole production chain, ranging from pretreatment, to dispensing and potting units to aftertreatment, including control and handling systems for the parts to be potted.

References

Manufacturing companies of Germany
Companies based in Bavaria